Ólafur Indriði Stefánsson (born 3 July 1973 in Reykjavík, Iceland) is a former Icelandic handball player who, for many years was the captain of the Iceland men's national handball team but announced his international retirement after the 2012 London Olympics. His position was right back. At his peak he was considered to be one of the very best handball players in the world.

As a player for his national team, his goal tally of 1570 is third only to the Hungarian Péter Kovács and Gudjon Valur Sigurdsson. He is also one of the most enduring handball players of all times, being a senior field player since 1992.

He was voted Icelandic Sportsperson of the Year in 2002, 2003, 2008 and 2009. He won silver with the Icelandic handball team at the 2008 Beijing Olympics, as well as bronze at the 2010 European Championship.

Career in clubs
Ólafur's career started with the Reykjavík based sports club Valur. With Valur, Ólafur became Icelandic champion 5 times. After Valur, he transferred to the  Bundesliga, playing with LTV Wuppertal, then coached by Icelandic coach Viggó Sigurðsson. Later the joined another Icelandic coach, Alfreð Gíslason in SC Magdeburg. In 2003, Ólafur was transferred to top Spanish club BM Ciudad Real. At the pinnacle of his career, Ólafur Stefánsson enjoyed massive success with Ciudad, winning both the Champions League and the Spanish title multiple times. In 2009 he went back to Germany to play with Rhein-Neckar Löwen, then coached by Icelandic national team coach, Guðmundur Guðmundsson. On 1 July 2011 he signed for AG København, but after the club filed for bankruptcy in the summer of 2012 he was without a club for the remainder of the year. On December 7 his agent announced he had signed for the Lekhwiya Handball Team in Doha, Qatar.

Since March 2022 Ólafur works as assistant coach at Erlangen .

Career on the national team
In 1995, he was selected to play on the Iceland men's national handball team to take part in the world championships, which were held in Iceland.

He was captain for the national handball team on the 2008 Summer Olympics in Beijing (where Iceland won the silver medal), and again at the 2010 European Championship where Iceland finished third.

Family
He is the brother of Icelandic basketball player Jón Arnór Stefánsson] and former footballer Eggert Stefánsson who played with Fram in Úrvalsdeild karla.

Honours

Valur Reykjavík
Icelandic champion: 1991, 1993, 1994, 1995, 1996
Icelandic cup: 1993

SC Magdeburg
Bundesliga: 2001
DHB-Supercup: 2001
Champions League: 2002
EHF Cup: 1999, 2001
EHF Men's Champions Trophy: 2001, 2002

BM Ciudad Real
Liga ASOBAL : 2004, 2007, 2008, 2009
Copa ASOBAL: 2004, 2005, 2006, 2007, 2008
Supercopa ASOBAL: 2005, 2008
EHF Champions League: 2006, 2008, 2009
EHF Men's Champions Trophy: 2005, 2006

AG København
Danish Handball League : 2012
National Cup of Denmark: 2011

International
5th place at 1997 World Championship
4th place at 2002 European Championship
2nd at 2008 Olympic Games
3rd place at 2010 European Championship

Individual

Icelandic Sports Personality of the Year: 2002, 2003, 2008, 2009
Top Scorer at 2002 European Championship
Top Scorer in Magdeburg's history
Top Scorer in 2007-08 EHF Champions League
Top Scorer at BM Ciudad Real in 2002-03 season
Selected in 2002 European Championship All Star Team
Selected in 2004 Olympic Games All Star Team
Selected in 2008 Olympic Games All Star Team
Selected in 2010 European Championship All Star Team

Orders and special awards
Order of the Falcon - Knight Grand Cross in 2008

See also
List of handballers with 1000 or more international goals

References

External links
 Ólafur Stefánssons profile at rhein-neckar-loewen.de

1973 births
Living people
Olafur Stefansson
Olafur Stefansson
Olafur Stefansson
Handball players at the 2004 Summer Olympics
Handball players at the 2008 Summer Olympics
Handball players at the 2012 Summer Olympics
Liga ASOBAL players
Recipients of the Order of the Falcon
Rhein-Neckar Löwen players
BM Ciudad Real players
SC Magdeburg players
Olympic medalists in handball
Medalists at the 2008 Summer Olympics
Olafur Stefansson
Olafur Stefansson